Lecanora inaurata is a species of crustose lichen in the family Lecanoraceae. Found in the United States, it was described as new to science in 2016 by Caleb Morse and Douglas Ladd. The lichen occurs in open hardwood-dominated woodlands of the Edwards Plateau and grasslands of the southern Great Plains in Oklahoma and Texas. It is a member of the L. subfusca group in genus Lecanora.

See also
List of Lecanora species

References

inaurata
Lichen species
Lichens described in 2016
Lichens of the South-Central United States
Fungi without expected TNC conservation status